Det är ni som e dom konstiga, det är jag som e normal (English translation: You Are the Strange Ones, I Am the Normal One) is the third solo album of Swedish rock musician Joakim Thåström (not counting the soundtrack Singoalla). It was released in 1999 and was the first solo album after his time with his industrial rock band Peace Love & Pitbulls. It was much celebrated in Sweden, by fans and critics, and considered a return to Thåström's rock roots.

Track listing
"Från himlen sänt" – 04:25 (From Heaven Sent)
"En vacker död stad" – 03:14 (A Beautiful Dead City)
"Hjärter Dam" – 04:11 (Queen of Hearts)
"... ingen neråtsång" (Thåström, Per Hägglund) – 05:52 (...No Downwardsong)
"Två + två" – 04:28 (Two + Two)
"Städer när jag blöder" (Thåström, Henryk Lipp) – 04:45 (Cities When I Bleed)
"Suverän" (Thåström, Per Hägglund) – 04:39 (Sovereign)
"Precis som ni" (Thåström, Per Hägglund) – 04:54 (Just Like You)
"Ingenting gör mig" – 03:39 (Nothing Makes Me)
"Psalm #99" – 03:05

All songs are written by Joakim Thåström except where noted

Personnel
 Joakim Thåström – vocals, guitar, bass, organ
 Jörgen Wall – drums
 Heiki Kiviaho – bass
 Chips Kiesbye – guitar
 Henrik af Ugglas – organ
 Mikael Vestergren – guitar
 Micke Herrström – guitar, backing vocals
 Johan Reivén – bass, drums
 Tomas Brandt – guitar
 Henryk Lipp – Mellotron, synthesizers, programming
 Lotta Johansson – violin

Singles
"Hjärter dam"
"Två + två"
"Städer när jag blöder"

1999 albums
Joakim Thåström albums